Saint-Blaise-sur-Richelieu is a municipality in the Canadian province of Quebec. The population as of the Canada 2016 Census was 2,066. The town was founded in 1892.

Geography
The community is located within the Le Haut-Richelieu Regional County Municipality region about 15 kilometers north of the Canada-United States border in the Montérégie region. It is located about 40 kilometers south of Montreal.

The town is located within the provincial electoral district of Saint-Jean which includes parts of the city of Saint-Jean-sur-Richelieu situated a few kilometers to its north. It is situated in the western side of the Richelieu River along Quebec Route 223.

Demographics

Population

Language

Government

Municipal Council
Source:
 Jacques Desmarais, mayor
 Ronald Girardin, councillor (district #1)
 Christien Madison, councillor (district #2)
 Sylvain Raymond, councillor (district #3)
 Jules Bergerons, councillor (district #4)
 Éric Lachance councillor (district #5)
 Alain Gaucher, councillor (district #6)

Education

The South Shore Protestant Regional School Board previously served the municipality.

See also
 List of municipalities in Quebec

References

External links
 Profile of Saint-Blaise-sur-Richelieu from the Haut-Richelieu MRC page
 Google Map location of Saint-Blaise-sur-Richelieu

Municipalities in Quebec
Incorporated places in Le Haut-Richelieu Regional County Municipality